The governor of Sint Eustatius, Saba and Sint Maarten represented the Dutch rule in the Netherlands Antilles between 1639 and 1854.

List of governors
 Pieter Gardijn (1639?–1641)
 Abraham Adriaensz. (1641–1644)
 Pieter van de Woestijne (1644–?)
 Abraham Adriaensz. (1647?)
 Pieter Adriaensz. (1665)
 Thomas Morgan (Eng.) (1665–1666)
 Rose (Fr.) (1666-?)
 Pieter Adriaensz? (1668–1671)
 Lucas Jacobsen (1671–1672)
 John Pogson (Eng.) (1672–?)
 Peter Batterie (Eng.) (1674?–?)
 Louis Houctooper (1682–1686)
 Lucas Schorer (1686–1689)
 Comte de Blennac? (Fr.) (1689–1690)
 Thimotheus Thornhill (Eng.) (1690–1693)
 Johannis Salomonsz. (1693–1700)
 Jan Symonson Donker (a.i.) (1700–1701)
 Isaac Lamont (1701–1704)
 Jan Symonson Donker (a.i.) (1704–1709)
 Isaac Lamont (1709–1712)
 Jan Symonson Donker (1712–1717)
 Gerard de Mepsche (1717)
 Jan Heyliger (a.i.) (1717–1719)
 J. Stalperts (1719–1720)
 Jan Heyliger (a.i.) (1720–1721)
 Jacobus Stevensen (1721–1722)
 J. Linderay (a.i.) (1722–1725)
 J. Linderay (1725–1728)
 Everardt Raecx (1728–1733)
 Jan Heyliger (a.i.) (1733–1734)
 Jan Heyliger (1734–1736)
 Pieter Markoe (a.i.) (1736–1737)
 Isaac Faesch (1737–1740)
 Hendrik Coesvelt (1740–1741)
 Jasper Ellis (a.i.) (1741–1743)
 Johannes Heyliger Pz. (1743–1752)
 Jan de Windt (a.i.) (1752–1754)
 Jan de Windt (1754–1775)
 Abraham Heyliger (a.i.) (1775–1776)
 Johannes de Graeff (1776–1781)
 David Ogilvy (Eng.) (1781)
 James Cockburn (Eng.) (1781)
 Charles Chabert (Fr.) (1781–1784)
 Olivier Oyen (a.i.) (1784–1785)
 Abraham Heyliger (1785)
 Johannes Runnels (a.i.) (1785–1789)
 Pieter Anthony Godin (1789–1792)
 Johannes Runnels (a.i.) (1792–1795)
 Daniel Roda (a.i.) (1795–1801)
 Richard Blunt (Eng.) (1801–1802)
 John Wardlau (Eng.) (1802)
 Daniel Roda (a.i.) (1802)
 Albert van Heyningen (1802–1809)
 William Charles Mussenden (a.i.) (1809–1810)
 Charles(?) Barrow (Eng.) (1810–1816)
 Reinier 't Hoen (a.i.) (1816–1817)
 Abraham de Veer (1817–1822)
 Diederik Johannes van Romondt (a.i.) (1822–1823)
 Willem Augustus van Spengler (1825–1828)
 Thomas Peter Richardson (1828, ad-interim)
 Willem Johan Leendert van Raders (1828–1834)
 Willem Johan Leendert van Raders (1834–1836)
 Theophilus George Groebe (a.i.) (1836–1837)
 Johannes de Veer (1837–1854)

References
 This article includes information obtained from the Encyclopaedie van Nederlandsch West-Indië from 1914–1917.

Sint
Sint Eustatius, Saba and Sint Maarten, Governors
History of the Netherlands Antilles
History of Sint Eustatius
Lieutenant Governors of Saba
History of Sint Maarten
Sint Eustatius 
Saba (island)-related lists
Sint Maarten-related lists
Sint Eustatius-related lists
List
Lieutenant Governors of Sint Eustatius
Government of Sint Maarten
Government of Sint Eustatius